Adrián Menéndez and Jaroslav Pospíšil were the defending champions but decided not to participate.
Alessandro Giannessi and Gianluca Naso won the title, defeating Gerard Granollers and Jordi Samper-Montana in the final, 7–5, 7–6(7–3).

Seeds

Draw

Draw

References
 Main Draw

2013 Doubles
Meknes - Doubles